The Sal languages are a branch of Sino-Tibetan languages spoken in northeast India, parts of Bangladesh, and Burma.

Alternative names
Ethnologue calls the group "Jingpho–Konyak–Bodo", while Scott DeLancey (2015) refers to it as "Bodo-Konyak-Jinghpaw" (BKJ). Glottolog lists this branch as “Brahmaputran (brah1260)”.

Classification within Sino-Tibetan
Scott DeLancey (2015) considers the Sal languages, which he refers to as Bodo-Konyak-Jinghpaw (BKJ), to be part of a wider Central Tibeto-Burman group.

Internal classification
 noted that the Bodo–Garo, Konyak, and Jingpho (Kachin) languages, as well as the extinct Chairel language, shared distinctive roots for "sun" and "fire".

 proposed a grouping of the Bodo–Garo, Konyak (Northern Naga), and Jingpho languages, characterized by several shared lexical innovations, including:
 *sal "sun" (STEDT #2753)
 *war "fire" (STEDT #2152)
 *s-raŋ "sky" (STEDT #3571)
 *wa "father" (STEDT #5484)
 *nu "mother" (STEDT #1621)
Burling (1983) called the proposed group Sal, after the words sal, san and jan for "sun" in various of these languages.
 argues that some of Burling's proposed innovations are either not attested across the Sal languages, or have cognates in other Sino-Tibetan languages. Nevertheless, Matisoff (2013) accepts Burling's Sal group, and considers *s-raŋ 'sky/rain' and *nu 'mother' to be the most convincing Sal innovations.

The family is generally presented with three branches:
 The Bodo–Garo languages, including the Bodo and Koch languages, are spoken in the northeast Indian states of Assam, Meghalaya and Tripura.
 The Konyak languages are spoken by the Naga people in southeastern Arunachal Pradesh and northeastern Nagaland (both in northeastern India). (The remaining languages of Nagaland belong to the separate Kuki-Chin-Naga group.)
 The Kachinic or Jingpho–Luish languages include Jingpho (Jinghpaw, Singhpo or Kachin), spoken in northern Burma and adjacent regions, and the Luish (or Sak) languages spoken in western Burma.

Shafer had grouped the first two as his Baric division, and  also combines them as a subbranch.

Bradley (1997) tentatively considers Pyu and Kuki-Chin to be possibly related to Sal, but is uncertain about this.

Peterson (2009) considers Mru-Hkongso to be a separate Tibeto-Burman branch, but notes that Mru-Hkongso shares similarities with Bodo–Garo that could be due to the early split of Mruic from a Tibeto-Burman branch that included Bodo–Garo.

van Driem (2011)
The Brahmaputran branch of van Driem (2011) has three variants:
Bodo–Garo and Konyak.
Bodo–Garo, Konyak, and Dhimalish.
Bodo–Garo, Konyak, Dhimalish, and Kachin–Luic.
The smallest is his most recent, and the one van Driem considers a well-established low-level group of Sino-Tibetan. However, Dhimalish is not accepted as a Sal language by Glottolog. Sotrug (2015) and Gerber, et al. (2016) consider Dhimalish to be particularly closely related to the Kiranti languages rather than to the Sal languages.

Matisoff (2012, 2013)
James Matisoff (2012) makes the following observations about the Sal grouping.

Although Bodo–Garo and Northeastern Naga (Konyak) are indeed closely related, Jingpho and Northeastern Naga (Konyak) seem to be even more closely related to each other than Jingpho and Bodo-Garo are to each other.
Luish is the Tibeto-Burman branch most closely related to Jingpho, for which further evidence is provided in Matisoff (2013).
Similarities between Jingpho and Nungish are due to contact. Thus, Nungish is not particularly closely related to Jingpho, and is not a Sal language. On the other hand, Lolo-Burmese appears to be more closely related to Nungish than to Jingpho.

Matisoff (2012) notes that these Tibeto-Burman branches did not split off neatly in a tree-like fashion, but rather form a linkage. Nevertheless, Matisoff (2013:30) still provides the following Stammbaum for the Sal branch.
Sal
Bodo–Garo
Jingpho-Konyak
Konyakian (Northern Naga)
Jingpho-Asakian
Jingphoic
Asakian

The unclassified extinct Taman language of northern Myanmar displays some similarities with Luish languages, Jingpho, and Bodo-Garo, but it is undetermined whether Taman is a Sal language or not.

References

Bibliography